Andrey Poitschke (born  in Berlin) is a German male weightlifter, competing in the 85 kg category and representing Germany at international competitions. He participated at the 1996 Summer Olympics in the 76 kg event. He competed at world championships, most recently at the 1999 World Weightlifting Championships.

Major results

References

External links
 

1972 births
Living people
German male weightlifters
Weightlifters at the 1996 Summer Olympics
Olympic weightlifters of Germany
Sportspeople from Berlin